The Escuela de Periodismo Carlos Septién García (EPCSG - School of Journalism Carlos Septién García) is a Mexican educational institution of journalism. It was founded by Luis Beltrán y Mendoza, and supported by the Acción Católica Mexicana (Mexican Catholic Action), on May 30, 1939, and achieved certification of the Secretaría de Educación Pública on July 2, 1976. The school was named after its second director. This school was the first in Mexico to be dedicated specifically to journalism.

Under the leadership of Alejandro Avilés Insunza the school detached itself from the Acción Católica Mexicana and its associated political and ideological tendencies concerning academic freedom.

Principals 
 1949-1951: Fernando Díez de Urdanivia y Díaz (1897–1966)
 1951-1953: Carlos Septién García (1915–1953)
 1953-1958: José N. Chávez González
 1958-1963: Carlos Alvear Acevedo
 1963-1984: Alejandro Avilés Insunza (1915–2005)
 1984-2001: Manuel Pérez Miranda
 2001-2004: Alejandro Hernández
 2004-2008: Manuel Pérez Miranda (second time)
 2009-2016:-José Luis Vázquez Baeza
 2016-2022: Víctor Hugo Villalva
 2022-present: Analletzin Díaz Alcalá

Further reading 
 Salvador Flores Llamas: La Septién García, forjadora de periodistas profesionales veraces. Parte 1, February 12, 2009. 
 Salvador Flores Llamas: La Septién García, forjadora de periodistas profesionales veraces. Parte 2, February 19, 2009.

References

External links 
 

Journalism schools in South America
Education in Mexico
Education in Mexico City
Educational institutions established in 1949
1949 establishments in Mexico
Mexican journalism organizations